Armando Emilio Guebuza Bridge is a bridge in Mozambique that crosses the Zambezi River. It connects the provinces of Sofala and Zambezia. It is named after Armando Guebuza, a former President of Mozambique.

Gallery

See also
List of longest bridges in the world
List of crossings of the Zambezi River

References

External links
Video Clip about the bridge

Bridges in Mozambique
Bridges over the Zambezi River
Buildings and structures in Sofala Province
Buildings and structures in Zambezia Province
Toll bridges